M. Appadurai (born 11 December 1949) was a member of the 14th Lok Sabha of India. He represented the Tenkasi constituency of Tamil Nadu and is a member of the Communist Party of India (CPI) political party. He is professionally a Social Worker. He was elected in the legislative assembly elections (1980–1984) in Tamil Nadu. He represented the Ottapidaram (State Assembly Constituency).

References

Living people
1949 births
Communist Party of India politicians from Tamil Nadu
Lok Sabha members from Tamil Nadu
India MPs 2004–2009
People from Thoothukudi
People from Tirunelveli district
Tamil Nadu MLAs 1980–1984